The Charlton Street Gang was a New York City street gang and river pirates during the mid-nineteenth century.  

The Charlton Street Gang were one of the earliest river pirate gangs. They raided small cargo ships in the North River of New York Harbor during the post-Civil War period of the 1860s. After a time the ocean liners and major shipping vessels around the Manhattan west side dockyards became so well protected that the gang moved upriver. 

In 1869, under the leadership of Sadie the Goat, the gang stole a sloop, and soon began raiding merchant ships and homes along the Hudson River, from the Harlem River as far as Poughkeepsie and Albany, New York. Flying the flag of the Jolly Roger, the gang was extremely successful. They became known for kidnapping wealthy men, women and children for ransom. According to newspapers of the period, Sadie the Goat allegedly had forced several male victims to walk the plank. However, after several victims had been murdered by the gang, local Hudson Valley residents formed a vigilante group. After a number of Charlton Street gang members were killed in a series of violent battles, the gang decided to retreat to the New York waterfront, where they returned to street crime. They eventually dissolved by the end of the decade.

See also
Daybreak Boys
Patsy Conroy
Patsy Conroy Gang
Sadie Farrell
George Gastlin (Steamboat Squad)
Hook Gang

References
Sifakis, Carl. Encyclopedia of American Crime, New York, Facts on File Inc., 1982

19th-century American criminals
Former gangs in New York City
American pirates
19th-century pirates